The European Athletics Championships is a biennial (from 2010) athletics event organised by the European Athletics Association and is recognised as the elite continental outdoor athletics championships for Europe.

Editions 
First held, for men only, in 1934 in Turin, and separately for women for the first time in Vienna in 1938, the Championships took place every four years following the end of the World War II, with the exception of the 1969 and 1971 editions, becoming a joint men's and women's competition from the third edition in 1946 in Oslo. Since 2010, they have been organised every two years, and when they coincide with the Summer Olympics, the marathon and racewalking events are not contested. From 2016, a half-marathon event  has been held in those Olympic years, and both the marathon and half-marathon events held as part of the Championships also function as the principle European elite team events at those distances. 

In 2018 and 2022, the European Athletics Championships formed part of the quadrennial multi-sport  European Championships, a new event designed and held by individual European sports federations. In 2022, European Athletics announced its intention to withdraw from the multi-sport event for 2026. 

The 2020 edition set for Charlety Stadium in Paris was cancelled due to the COVID-19 pandemic, making this the first cancellation of the event since the 1942 championship was abandoned due to World War II. The event was not moved to an alternative date, with Munich continuing as the scheduled host in 2022.

An indoor equivalent, the European Athletics Indoor Championships, is organised by the European Athletic Association in odd numbered years.

While the European Games of 2015 featured athletics, and shall do so again in 2023, these events are not editions of the European Athletics Championships.

Notes: ♂ – men, ♀ – women

All-time medal table
Updated after 2022 European Athletics Championships.Former countries are pointed in italic. Team medals in half marathon and marathon are not included into this table (see European Half Marathon Cup and European Marathon Cup).

The championships were long dominated by Eastern Bloc countries, especially the Soviet Union and East Germany. About 30 years after the dissolution of both countries, with the 2022 edition, Great Britain & Northern Ireland finally took the lead in the all-time medal table. Although German athletes, who have historically competed for various national teams (Nazi Germany, West Germany, East Germany and present-day reunified Germany), have won much more medals in total.

  was the name, under which Russian athletes competed in the 2016 and 2018 Championships. Their medals were not included in the official medal table.

As of 2022, Andorra, Armenia, Bosnia and Herzegovina, Cyprus, Georgia, Gibraltar, Kosovo, Liechtenstein, Malta, Monaco, North Macedonia and San Marino have yet to win a medal. Saar competed once in 1954 European Athletics Championships without winning a medal.

Championship records

Multiple winners

Boldface denotes active athletes and highest medal count among all athletes (including these who not included in these tables) per type.

Discus thrower Sandra Perković of Croatia holds the record for most gold medals at six. Marita Koch of East Germany is the only other athlete to have won 6 gold medals, winning the 400 metres and 4 x 400 metres relay double on three occasions between 1978 and 1986. French steeple-chaser Mahiedine Mekhissi-Benabbad won six finals at European championships, but was disqualified post-race having won the 2014 men's steeplechase in Zurich for removing his vest in the home straight.

Men

Women

Multiple medallists

A total of 11 men and 13 women have won six or more medals at the competition.

Men

Women

Most medals in the same event
A total of 17 men and 8 women have won four or more medals in the same event. Sandra Perković of Croatia is the only athlete, male or female, to win the same event, the women's discus throw six times between 2010 and 2022.

Men

Women

Most appearances
A total of 36 men and 29 women have at least 6 appearances.

Men

* including participation at one European Championships at which he was disqualified for a doping offence

Women

* including participation at one European Championships at which she was disqualified for a doping offence

See also 
European Athletics Indoor Championships
International Athletics Championships and Games
List of European Athletics Championships medalists (men)
List of European Athletics Championships medalists (women)
List of European records in athletics
List of stripped European Athletics Championships medals
World Para Athletics European Championships

Notes

References

External links 

Official European Athletics website
Berlin 2018 official website | Paris 2020 official website

 
European championships
Championships
Biennial athletics competitions
Recurring sporting events established in 1934
Continental athletics championships
1934 establishments in Europe